Mazharul Haq Shah Chowdhury is a Jatiya Party (Ershad) politician and the former Member of Parliament of Chittagong-2.

Career
Chowdhury was elected to parliament from Chittagong-4 in 1988. In 2004, he was appointed vice-chairman of Jatiya Party.

References

Jatiya Party politicians
Living people
4th Jatiya Sangsad members
Year of birth missing (living people)